Korean painting includes paintings made in Korea or by overseas Koreans on all surfaces. The earliest surviving Korean paintings are murals in the Goguryeo tombs, of which considerable numbers survive, the oldest from some 2,000 years ago (mostly now in North Korea), with varied scenes including dancers, hunting and spirits.  It has been hypothesized  the Takamatsuzuka Tomb in Japan, from the 7th-century end of the Goguryeo period, has paintings with Goguryeo influence,   either done by Goguryeo artists, or Japanese one trained by Goguryeo people.  Since a lot of influences came into the Korean peninsula from China during the Three Kingdoms period.  Until the Joseon dynasty the primary influence was Chinese painting though done with Korean landscapes, facial features, Buddhist topics, and an emphasis on celestial observation in keeping with the rapid development of Korean astronomy.

Painting in the Goryeo period (918–1392) was dominated by Buddhist scroll paintings, adapting Chinese styles; about 160 survive from the period. In this period the royal artist's school or academy, the Dohwaseo was established, with examinations for artists and run by bureaucrats of the court.  Around the start of the Joseon period (1392–1897), the largely monochrome ink-wash painting tradition already long-established in China was introduced, and has remained an important strand in Korean and Japanese painting, with the local version of the shan shui style of mountain landscape painting as important as in China.

Thereafter Korean painting including different traditions, of monochromatic works of black brushwork, sometimes by amateurs, professional works with colour, including many genre scenes, and animal and bird-and-flower painting, and colourful folk art called minhwa, as well as a continuing tradition of Buddhist devotional scrolls called taenghwa, ritual arts, tomb paintings, and festival arts which had extensive use of colour.  This distinction was often class-based: scholars, particularly in Confucian art felt that one could see colour in monochromatic paintings within the gradations and felt that the actual use of colour coarsened the paintings, and restricted the imagination. Korean folk art, and painting of architectural frames was seen as brightening certain outside wood frames, and again within the tradition of Chinese architecture, and the early Buddhist influences of profuse rich halos and primary colours inspired by Indian art.

Korean painters in the post-1945 period have assimilated some of the approaches of the west. Certain European artists with thick impasto technique and foregrounded brushstrokes captured the Korean interest first. Such artists as Gauguin, Monticelli, Van Gogh, Cézanne, Pissarro, and Braque have been highly influential as they have been the most taught in art schools, with books both readily available and translated into Korean early. And from these have been drawn the tonal palettes of modern Korean artists: yellow ochre, cadmium yellow, Naples yellow, red earth, and sienna. All thickly painted, roughly stroked, and often showing heavily textured canvases or thick pebbled handmade papers.

Genre subjects 

The expected genres of Buddhist art showing the Buddha, or Buddhist monks, and Confucian art of scholars in repose, or studying in quiet often mountainous surroundings follows general East Asian art trends. Nimbus colours are not necessarily gold, and may be suggested by lighter colours. Faces tend to realism and show humanity and age. Drapery is done with some to great care. The face is generally two-dimensional, the drapery three-dimensional. As in medieval and renaissance western art, drapery and faces are done often by two or three artists who specialize in one particular painterly skill. Iconography follows Buddhist iconography.

Scholars tend to have the traditional stove-pipe hats, or other rank hats, and scholar's monochromatic robes. Typically they are at rest in teahouses near mountains or at mountain lodges, or will be pictured with their teachers or mentors.

Hunting scenes, familiar throughout the entire world, are often seen in Korean courtly art, and are reminiscent of Mongolian and Persian hunting scenes. Wild boar, deer, and stags, and Siberian tigers as well were hunted. Particularly lethal spears and spear-handled maces were used by horsemen within hunting grounds after archers on the ground led the initial provocation of the animals as beaters.
Buddhas tend to have Korean facial features, and are in easy resting positions.

Categories

Daoist Paintings 
 Longevity symbols: Pictures of the ten longevity symbol figure most prominently among folk paintings of this category. The ten longevity symbols (Shipjangsaengdo), including the sun, clouds, mountains, water, bamboo, pine, crane, deer, turtle and the mushroom of immortality are the often presented all together in a single picture.

 Tiger: The tiger was among the most popular motifs in Korea folk painting. Likely originating from the mythical "White tiger" guardian spirit of the east, a notable characteristic about the tiger as featured in Korea folk traditions is how it is seldom portrayed as a ferocious beast but as a friendly and sometimes even funny and stupid animal.
 The mountain spirit and dragon king: The popular mountain spirit and dragon king motifs have their origins in two famous figures in Korean history, Dangun and Munmu. Dangun is the legendary progenitor of the Korean people who is said to have turned into a mountain spirit. The dragon king is usually depicted as a mighty animal flying amidst the clouds over a sea of high waves.
 The Naewat-dang shamanic paintings are among the oldest shamanic paintings known in Korea.

Buddhist Paintings 
Buddhist temples and hermitages across the country are rich archives of folk paintings, ranging from large icon images for ritual use to illustrations for sutras and anecdotes about famous monks and their portraits. These temple painting are noted for simple compositions and bright colors.

Confucian Paintings 
Folk paintings in this category included character designs of the popular themes of loyalty and filial piety, pictures depicting the life stories of renowned scholars and depictions of a carp jumping up from the river to transform into a dragon symbolizing the aspiration for distinguished academic achievement and a successful career in officialdom.

Decorative Painting 
The vast majority of ancient folk painting were used for decorative purposes. These paintings generally repeat popular motifs with relatively poor techniques, but attest to the nation's religious tradition harmonizing various faiths such as shamanism, Taoism, Buddhism and Confucianism.

Goguryeo painters 

Goguryeo art, preserved largely in tomb paintings, is noted for the vigour of its imagery. Finely detailed art can be seen in Goguryeo tombs and other murals. Many of the art pieces has an original style of painting.

Goguryeo tomb murals date from around AD 500 during the Goguryeo period, 37 BC-AD 668. These magnificent, still strongly colored murals show daily life and Korean mythologies of the time. By 2005, 70 murals had been found, mostly in the Taedong river basin near Pyongyang, the Anak area in South Hwanghae Province.

Goryeo Dynasty 

During the Goryeo dynasty exceptionally beautiful paintings were produced in the service of Buddhism; paintings of the bodhisattva Avalokiteshvara (Korean: Gwaneum Bosal) are especially noted for their elegance and spirituality. The patronage of the Goryeo's leading families resulted in the production of the high quality Buddhist paintings like refined and detailed paintings of Buddhist saints or monks.

King Gongmin of Goryeo (1330–1374) was a significant painter of the period.  Yi Nyeong, a court painter, and Yi Je-hyeon, a scholar-painter, are considered significant Goryeo artists outside of the Buddhist tradition.

Joseon Dynasty 

The influence of Confucianism superseded that of Buddhism in this period, however Buddhist elements remained and it is not true that Buddhist art declined, it continued, and was encouraged but not by the royal centres of art, or the accepted taste of the Joseon Dynasty publicly; however in private homes, and indeed in the summer palaces of the Joseon Dynasty kings, the simplicity of Buddhist art was given great appreciation – but it was not seen as citified art.

During the transitional period leading into the Joseon dynasty some Korean buddhist painters left for Japan. Yi Su-mun (1400?–1450?) who is considered the founder of Soga school of Japan, was a boat-companion of the older priest-painter, Shubun of Shokokuji when he returned from Korea to Japan in 1424. Japanese tradition declared that Yi was so skilled after his "Catfish and Gourd" painting that Shogun Yoshimochi claimed him to be a son of the legendary Josetsu, as an adoptive honorific. Yi painted alongside and influenced the originals of Japanese zen art; and was known in Japan by his Japanese name Ri Shubun or the Korean Shubun. The entire tradition of needle points in Japanese art began with Yi, and continued through his students, known as the Soga School, a more natural group of artists than the courtly school patronized by the Ashikaga shoguns.

While the Joseon Dynasty began under military auspices, Goryeo styles were let to evolve, and Buddhist iconography (bamboo, orchid, plum and chrysanthemum; and the familiar knotted goodluck symbols) were still a part of genre paintings. Neither colours nor forms had any real change, and rulers stood aside from edicts on art. Ming ideals and imported techniques continued in early dynasty idealized works.

Early dynasty painters include:

 An Gyeon, 15th century painter

Mid-dynasty painting styles moved towards increased realism. A national painting style of landscapes called "true view" began – moving from the traditional Chinese style of idealized general landscapes to particular locations exactly rendered. While not photographic, the style was academic enough to become established and supported as a standardized style in Korean painting.

Mid-dynasty painters include:

 Hwang Jipjung (born 1533)

The mid to late Joseon dynasty is considered the golden age of Korean painting. It coincides with the shock of the collapse of Ming dynasty links with the Manchu emperors accession in China, and the forcing of Korean artists to build new artistic models based on nationalism and an inner search for particular Korean subjects. At this time China ceased to have pre-eminent influence, Korean art took its own course, and became increasingly distinctive.

Genre paintings of the late Joseon Dynasty Era and true-view landscape paintings have become celebrated and emblematic, but it also shows the unassuming reality of Korean people and their past, not just those that hold high positions of power but those who work under them, the commoners or lower classes and seemingly even women (Park J.P., 2018).  In modern Korea, these paintings are held up and preserved as mementos that show the heart-warming and harmonious late Joseon Dynasties thriving society. With these paintings, it is also believed to have brought a projection of an uncomplicated and nostalgic-producing past into the eyes of the viewer, these nothing short of masterpiece works created by Kim Hong-do(1745 – 1806?-1814?) and Sin Yun-Bok(1758 – ?) are promoted as a splendid collection of art that describe the state, people, and history of Korea. The work put into these paintings show the academic attention invested towards understanding the past of Korea, and that motivation could extend to the viewer as the art of Korea has become an integral part to pursuing the studies and knowledge of Korea and its history.

Some modern studies relate the historical particularities of the time such as the cultural and ideological landscape to the Korean artists’ motivation and inspiration, as the attention that was put into their artwork nurtured the popularization of these paintings. Those include the different viewpoints on how they became popular at the time, one viewpoint being the analysis of Korean genre paintings being a product of the past Koreans pride and confidence after they began treating their own culture as a legitimate heir to Chinas High Civilization (Park J.P., 2018). The disappearance of the late Confucian civilization and the fall of the Ming in mainland China under Manchu Qing, these events led to the late Joseon era artists to recapture and redefine the values of Joseon Koreas landscape and their society in these new paintings (Park J.P., 2018).  Another viewpoint would be an interpretive approach towards the escalating interest of learning at the time, which provided the Joseon era artists the motivation and inspiration needed to view the scenes of daily life in Korea and the changes in the social landscape from a new perspective, as Joseon artists put much time in their pursuit of academic practical studies, the people and their lives were a key factor in contributing to their artwork, as well as their determination to depict and observe the people they encountered around them.

Among many of the artists of the mid to late Joseon era that painted quotidian scenes of the people of Korea, one yangban artist stood out and was described as a founding father of this genre, and that artist is Yun Duseo(1668 – 1715). Yun Duseo would go on to paint many drawings that were based on the labors, behaviors, leisure and emotions of the common people that he observed around him. This would begin to stir the people as it was unprecedented in that time period, and the topic of these artworks would become primary motifs rather than decorative additions as in previous eras.

The list of major painters is long, but the most notable names include:

 Jeong Seon (1676–1759), a literati painter influenced by the Wu school of the Ming dynasty in China; much taken by the Diamond mountain landscape.
 Yun Duseo (1668–1715), a portraitist.
 Kim Hong-do (1745–1806?) aka Danwon in his pen name, did highly coloured crowded scenes of common and working-class people in many natural work activities – his paintings have a post-card or photographic realism in a palette of whites, blues, and greens. There is little if any calligraphy in his works; but they have a sense of humour and variety of gestures and movement that make them highly imitated to this day.
 Shin Yun-bok (1758-?) aka Hyewon in his pen name, a court painter who did paintings often of the scholarly or yangban classes in motion through stylized natural settings; he is famous for his strong reds and blues, and grayish mountainscapes.
 Jang Seung-eop (1843–1897) aka Owon in his pen name, was a painter of the late Joseon Dynasty in Korea and one of three great wons of Joseon Korea.

What calligraphy used is often discreetly done.

Other important artists of the "literati school" include:

 Yi Kyong-yun
 Kang Se-hwang

Chaekgeori is a genre of still-life painting from the Joseon period of Korea that features books as the dominant subject. Chaekgeori flourished from the second half of the 18th century to the first half of the 20th century and was enjoyed by all members of the population, from the king to the commoners, revealing the infatuation with books and learning in Korean culture.

Gallery

Artists during the Japanese occupation 

Korean artists from the middle 1880s until 1945 had a very difficult time when Korea was freed by the allies after the unconditional surrender of Japan.

From the 1880s onward, the emerging popularity of western art in Japan lead to a low opinion of traditional Korean art. Nevertheless, the formation of the Korean crafts museum in 1924 by Japanese philosopher Yanagi Sōetsu is a strong example of Japanese aesthetes who still appreciated Korean art.

Japan also held an exhibition of Korean art that produced many young Korean artists such as Park Su-geun. To this date there has not been a retrospective show of the hidden art under Japanese occupation, or a discussion of the conflicts between those who were forced into compromise under Japanese artistic demands. It is a sensitive issue, with artists who studied and worked in Japan and painted in the Japanese style forced into self-defense and justification of compromise without other alternatives.

Bridging the late Joseon dynasty and the Japanese occupation period were noteworthy artists such as:

 Chi Un-Yeong (1853–1936)

and others.

Major 20th-century Korean artists 
Colour theory has been used over formal perspective, and there has yet to be an overlap between painterly art and pop-graphics, since the primary influence on painters is Korean pottery.

 Kim Tschang-yeul
 Park Su-geun
 Nam June Paik
 Chang Ucchin
 Seund Ja Rhee
 Lee Ufan

New wave 

 Lee Dong Youb
 Suh Yongsun

21st-century Korean artists 

Haegue Yang
Choi Jeong Hwa
Amy Sol
 David Choe
 Seonna Hong
 Tschoon Su Kim
 Junggeun Oh
 Kim Sang-soon

See also 
Korean art
Korean calligraphy
List of Korean painters
 Chinese painting
 Japanese painting
 History of Asian art

Notes

References 
Dunn, Michael, The Art of East Asia, ed. Gabriele Fahr-Becker, Volume 2, 1998, Könemann,

Further reading

External links 

 Pyongyang-painters.com is specialized on introducing North Korean painters
 General introduction
 Northeast Asia's intramural mural wars, 6th century Korean murals
 Painting by Chi Un-Yeong (1853–1936) of the famous 11th-century Chinese scholar-poet Su Dong-Po
 Online Collection of Modern and Contemporary Korean Paintings

 
Korean art